Qabiao can refer to:

Qabiao language
Qabiao people